A taut object is one under tension.

Taut is also a surname, and may refer to:
 Bruno Taut (1880–1938), prolific German architect, urban planner and author
 Max Taut (1884–1967), German architect

Taut may also refer to:
 Tauț, a commune in Arad County, Romania
 Tăut, a village in Batăr Commune, Bihor County, Romania
 Taut International, sports drink company acquired by A.G. Barr

TAUT, an acronym, may refer to:
 Tramways and Urban Transit, a monthly magazine published in the UK
 The complement of the SAT-problem;  testing if a formula is a tautology, known to be co-NP-complete.

Surnames